The God that Failed is a 1949 collection of six essays by Louis Fischer, André Gide, Arthur Koestler, Ignazio Silone, Stephen Spender, and Richard Wright. The common theme of the essays is the authors' disillusionment with and abandonment of communism.

Essays
Richard Crossman, the British Labour Party Member of Parliament who conceived and edited the volume, at one point approached the famous American ex-communist Whittaker Chambers about contributing an essay to the book.  At the time Chambers was still employed by Time magazine, having not yet gone public with his charges against Alger Hiss, and so declined to participate.

The book contains Fischer's definition of "Kronstadt" as the moment in which some communists or fellow travellers decide not just to leave the Communist Party but to oppose it as anti-communists.  Editor Crossman said in the book's introduction:  "The Kronstadt rebels called for Soviet power free from Bolshevik dominance" (p. x). After describing the actual Kronstadt rebellion, Fischer spent many pages applying the concept to some subsequent former communists—including himself:  "What counts decisively is the 'Kronstadt.'  Until its advent, one may waver emotionally or doubt intellectually or even reject the cause altogether in one's mind and yet refuse to attack it. I had no 'Kronstadt' for many years" (p. 204). Writers who subsequently picked up the term have included Whittaker Chambers, Clark Kerr, David Edgar, William F. Buckley, Jr., and Norman Podhoretz.

References

1949 non-fiction books
1949 anthologies
Essay anthologies
Books by Arthur Koestler
Works by André Gide
Works by Ignazio Silone
Works by Stephen Spender
Works by Richard Wright (author)
Books critical of communism
Harper & Brothers books